The following lists events that happened during 1999 in Australia.

Incumbents

Monarch – Elizabeth II
Governor-General – Sir William Deane
Prime Minister – John Howard
Deputy Prime Minister – Tim Fischer (until 20 July), then John Anderson
Opposition Leader – Kim Beazley
Chief Justice – Murray Gleeson

State and Territory Leaders
Premier of New South Wales – Bob Carr
Opposition Leader – Kerry Chikarovski
Premier of Queensland – Peter Beattie
Opposition Leader – Rob Borbidge
Premier of South Australia – John Olsen
Opposition Leader – Mike Rann
Premier of Tasmania – Jim Bacon
Opposition Leader – Tony Rundle (until 2 July), then Sue Napier
Premier of Victoria – Jeff Kennett (until 19 October), then Steve Bracks
Opposition Leader – John Brumby (until 22 March), then Steve Bracks (until 19 October), then Jeff Kennett (until 26 October), then Denis Napthine
Premier of Western Australia – Richard Court
Opposition Leader – Geoff Gallop
Chief Minister of the Australian Capital Territory – Kate Carnell
Opposition Leader – Jon Stanhope
Chief Minister of the Northern Territory – Shane Stone (until 8 February), then Denis Burke
Opposition Leader – Maggie Hickey (until 2 February), then Clare Martin
Chief Minister of Norfolk Island – George Smith

Governors and Administrators
Governor of New South Wales – Gordon Samuels
Governor of Queensland – Peter Arnison
Governor of South Australia – Sir Eric Neal
Governor of Tasmania – Sir Guy Green
Governor of Victoria – Sir James Gobbo
Governor of Western Australia – Michael Jeffery
Administrator of the Australian Indian Ocean Territories – Bill Taylor (from 4 February)
Administrator of Norfolk Island – Tony Messner
Administrator of the Northern Territory – Neil Conn

Events

February
1 February - An unprecedented rush for Telstra shares helps vault Australian share prices to a record high, as investors focus on the continued strong performance of the local economy. The all ordinaries index surges 29.9 points.
3 February - An industry review into Queensland's diving industry is released and prompts the Queensland Government to announce its plans to impose jail time or hefty fines on operators falling short of safety requirements.

March
19 March - John Brumby resigns as leader of the Victorian Labor Party. 
21 March - Channel Nine's 60 Minutes programme airs a controversial report which claims that former Prime Minister Paul Keating lied to Parliament about when he divested himself of his joint share in a Darling Downs piggery, as well as accusing him of fleecing his business partner Al Constantinidis of the majority of the profits.
22 March - 
Victorian Shadow Treasurer Steve Bracks becomes leader of the Victorian Labor Party.
Tropical Cyclone Vance hits the West Australian coast with winds of 230 km/h.  The small coastal town of Exmouth is badly damaged. 
Dick Smith, chairman of the Civil Aviation Authority resigns, followed by board member Janine Shepherd the following day.
23 March - Prime Minister John Howard is criticised by the Opposition and Democrats for his proposal that the concept of "mateship" be introduced into a preamble to the Australian Constitution.  He also creates controversy by proposing that Indigenous Australians should be referred to in the preamble as having "inhabited" the land rather than being "custodians" of it.
24 March - Media mogul Kerry Packer publicly endorses views that the Federal Government should deregulate the media and abolish cross-media ownership rules which stop Packer from taking over the Fairfax newspaper group, as well as calling for foreign ownership restrictions to be lifted.
27 March – The ALP government of Bob Carr is re-elected in the 1999 New South Wales state election.

April
9 April - The Premiers' Conference results in the signing of a new agreement on Commonwealth-State financial relations which offers the states a guaranteed share of tax revenue in the event that the Senate votes for a GST, thereby negating the need for annual negotiations over how tax revenue should be shared.
14 April – A massive hailstorm hits Sydney, with most of the damage being centred on the Eastern Suburbs. It is the second most costliest natural disaster in Australian history, causing $1.7 billion in insured damages.

May
11 May – The biotechnology industry receives a record $800 million in the federal budget.
21 May – Eight decaying bodies are found in barrels in a disused bank vault north of Adelaide, marking the beginning of the Snowtown murders case, which were Australia's worst ever serial killings. More bodies were found underneath a house in Adelaide on 26 May.

June
21 June - Senator Mal Colston joins fellow Independent Brian Harradine in supporting the Federal Government's $17 billion sale of the second portion of Telstra (constituting another 16 per cent), allowing the proposed sale to pass through the Senate and become finalised. After the sale, the Government now owns only 50.1 per cent of Telstra.
28 June – The GST bill is passed through the Senate, with the help of most of the Australian Democrats, in exchange for exemptions on fresh food.
30 June – Tim Fischer retires as federal leader of the National Party and is replaced by John Anderson the next day.

July
2 July - Liberal for Forests, a breakaway single-issue political party, is established in response to the turmoil in the West Australian Liberal Party on the issue of stopping logging in old-growth forests.
5 July - The Commonwealth Director of Public Prosecutions decides to drop the 28 fraud charges against former Senator Mal Colston after receiving two medical specialists' reports which both state that Mr Colston is too ill to face trial, either now or in the future. The decision draws criticism from the Federal Opposition for its timing, due to the fact that Mr Colston was well enough to vote in favour of the Telstra sale the week before.
6 July - 
Prime Minister John Howard meets Japan's Prime Minister Keizo Obuchi in Tokyo for trade talks and publicly expresses his disappointment over Indonesia's 4 July attack upon an international aid convoy which he says has placed Indonesia in the international spotlight. 
The trial of Federal MP and former West Australian Premier Carmen Lawrence begins in the Perth District Court where she pleads not guilty to three charges of giving false testimony to the Marks Royal Commission. 
13 July - ABC-TV's Media Watch programme reveals that radio announcer John Laws had accepted a sponsorship worth $1.2 million from the Banker's Association in return for favourable comments, thereby igniting the cash for comment scandal.
22 July - A landmark ruling by the Australian Competition & Consumer Commission forces Telstra to make its telephone network available to competitors such as Optus. 
23 July - A Perth District Court jury finds former West Australian Premier Carmen Lawrence not guilty of each of the three charges of giving false testimony to the Marks Royal Commission in 1995. 
27 July – 
A canyoning disaster at Saxetenbach Gorge near Interlaken in Switzerland. 21 tourists, 14 of them Australian, are killed.
The Sisters of Charity and St Vincent's Hospital reach agreement with the New South Wales Government to run an 18-month clinical trial of a medically supervised heroin injecting room to be established in Kings Cross, New South Wales.

August
18 August - The Supreme Court of Queensland rules that One Nation (Australia) was improperly registered at the 1998 Queensland State Election because it did not have the 500 members needed to register as a political party and the Court also finds that the registration was obtained by fraud and deception. 
26 August – The Prime Minister creates controversy when he avoids the use of the word 'sorry' when a motion was tabled in Parliament expressing 'deep & sincere regret that indigenous Australians suffered injustices under the practises of past generations'.
30 August – East Timor votes for independence from Indonesia. In the violence that follows, Australia is a major contributor of peacekeeping forces.

September
1 September – Jailed Care Australia workers, Steve Pratt and Peter Wallace, are freed from jail in Belgrade after being granted clemency by Yugoslav President Slobodan Milosevic.
18 September – In a shock result, Steve Bracks and the Labor Party form a minority government with three rural independents to oust the ruling Liberal/National coalition government of Jeff Kennett in Victoria.

November
3 November – The Reserve Bank announces an interest rate increase of 0.25%, the first since 1994.
6 November – A referendum is held to determine whether Australia should become a republic & whether a preamble is inserted into the constitution recognising the Aborigines as Australia's first people. The 'no' vote scores 54% on the republic question & 60% on the preamble question.
14 November – In response to the growing number of illegal immigrants, most of whom arrived by boat, the government allows police to board vessels in international waters. On 23 November, refugees were barred from seeking asylum if they had lived somewhere else for more than seven days or had the right to live somewhere else.

Undated
Wine Ark, wine storage provider is established.

Arts & Literature
 Murray Bail's novel Eucalyptus wins the Miles Franklin Award

Film
 The Craic
 Eye of the Beholder
 Holy Smoke!
 Paperback Hero
 Two Hands

Television
1 February – QSTV becomes an affiliate of the Seven Network, becoming known as Seven Central.
March – WIN Television WA commences broadcasting to regional & remote Western Australia, ending the long-time monopoly held by Golden West Network.
The Seven Network becomes the first Australian television network to introduce a watermark on its programs, although the watermark is not allowed to be broadcast on news or current affairs programs or Deal Or No Deal from 2004 onwards.
27 November – The last ever episode of Hey Hey It's Saturday goes to air.

Sport
14 February – Stadium Australia is opened to the public for the first time.
6 March – A world record crowd of 104,583 attend the first rugby league matches held at Stadium Australia. The Newcastle Knights defeat the Manly-Warringah Sea Eagles 41–10 & the Parramatta Eels defeat the St George Illawarra Dragons 20–10 in what is also the joint venture team's first match.
18 March – First day of the Australian Track & Field Championships for the 1998–1999 season, which are held at the Olympic Park in Melbourne, Victoria. The 10,000 metres was conducted at the Zatopek Classic, Melbourne on 5 December 1998. The men's decathlon event was staged at the Hobart Grand Prix on 25–27 February.
5 May – South Melbourne become National Soccer League Champions for a record equaling 4th time, defeating Sydney United 2–1 at Olympic Park.
6 June – Tony Lockett becomes the greatest goalscorer in VFL/AFL history by overtaking Gordon Coventry's long held record of 1299 career goals when he scores career goal number 1300 against the Collingwood Magpies at the Sydney Cricket Ground. Tony Lockett announces his retirement on 14 August.
20 June – Australia wins the 1999 Cricket World Cup, defeating Pakistan in the final.
11 July – Shaun Creighton wins the men's national marathon title, clocking 2:16:03 in Brisbane, while Carolyn Schuwalow claims her second women's title in 2:41:39.
27 July – Foundation clubs the Balmain Tigers & Western Suburbs Magpies vote to form the game's second joint venture team, the Wests Tigers. The team start playing as a joint venture in 2000.
13 August – The Adelaide Thunderbirds defeat the Adelaide Ravens 62–30 in the Commonwealth Bank Trophy netball grand final
28 August 
Victoria Park hosts its last VFL/AFL match when the Brisbane Lions (13.16.94) defeat Collingwood (8.4.52)
The North Sydney Bears play their final match as a first-grade side, defeating the North Queensland Cowboys 28–18.
29 August - Waverley Park hosts its last VFL/AFL match when Hawthorn (23.15.153) defeats the Sydney Swans (11.2.68)
18 September – In one of the classic matches of Australian rules football, Carlton (16.8.104) defeat Essendon (14.19.103) in the preliminary final.
25 September – The Kangaroos (19.10.124) defeat Carlton (12.17.89) to win the 103rd VFL/AFL premiership. It is the first all-Victorian grand final since 1995 & the first time the cup has not been won by the Adelaide Crows since 1996.
26 September – A new world record crown for rugby league is set when 107,961 people attend the first National Rugby League grand final held at Stadium Australia. In one of the most memorable & controversial grand finals in history, the Melbourne Storm, in just their second season of existence, defeat the St George Illawarra Dragons 20–18. The final outcome is determined when a penalty try is given to Melbourne's Craig Smith. Melbourne's win means that both the AFL trophy & NRL trophy have been won by teams from the same city for the first time. The Cronulla-Sutherland Sharks are named minor premiers, while the Western Suburbs Magpies, in their final first grade season following their merger with the Balmain Tigers, finish in last position, claiming their second consecutive wooden spoon.
3 October – In the third year of the split in the organisation of the Bathurst 1000 the traditional race was held for the last time and won by Paul Morris as the Bathurst 500 was declared after just 310 of the scheduled 500 kilometres due to unrelenting rain. It was a justification for Morris and the BMW team after being disqualified from victory two years ago.
10 October – South Sydney supporters rally through the streets of Sydney to protest against the rationalisation of the NRL to 14 teams for 2000.
15 October – The South Sydney Rabbitohs are put in lockdown for 2000.
2 November – Rogan Josh wins the Melbourne Cup.
6 November – Australia wins the 1999 Rugby World Cup, defeating France 35–12 in the final.
14 November – Steven Richards successfully defended his FAI Bathurst 1000 crown with co-driver Greg Murphy for Gibson Motor Sport. It was the third and final win for the GMS team.

Unknown Dates
Australia wins the 1999 Netball World Championships, defeating New Zealand in the final.

Births
 6 January – Eliza Scanlen, actress
 15 January – Patrick Naish, Australian rules footballer
 25 January – Jai Waetford, actor and singer
 10 March – Max Bryant, cricketer
 2 June – Campbell Graham, rugby league player
 19 August – Oregon Kaufusi, rugby league player
 10 September – Laura Taylor, swimmer
 24 September – Zac Lomax, rugby league player
 2 December – Payne Haas, rugby league player
 7 December – Bethany Whitmore, actress

Deaths
 16 January – Jim McClelland, 83, ALP politician
 6 February – Don Dunstan, 72, former Premier of South Australia
 24 April – Arthur Boyd, 78, painter
 10 May – Eric Willis, 77, Premier of New South Wales
 21 May – Colin Hayes, 75, champion trainer of thoroughbred racehorses
 6 June – Anne Haddy, 58, actress
 25 June – Sir Peter Abeles, 75, businessman
 3 July – Reg Bishop, 86, ALP politician
 17 July – Kevin Newman, 65, Liberal politician
 28 July – Doris Carter, 87, athlete
 23 September – Ivan Goff, 89, screenwriter
 27 October - Harry Kadwell, 97, rugby league footballer
 29 October – Eric Reece, 90, Premier of Tasmania
 30 December – Des Renford, 72, Marathon Swimmer

See also
 1999 in Australian television
 List of Australian films of 1999

References

 
Australia
Years of the 20th century in Australia